Cha Min-ji is a South Korean actress. She is known for her roles in dramas such as Queen of Mystery, How to Be Thirty and Oh My Ladylord. She also appeared in movies The Cat Funeral, Welcome and Unalterable.

Filmography

Television series

Film

Theater

Ambassadorship
 6th Handball Ambassador in 2007

Awards and nominations

References

External links
 
 

1990 births
Living people
21st-century South Korean actresses
South Korean female models
South Korean television actresses
South Korean film actresses